Hassan Ghafourifard (5 August 1943 – 9 March 2023) was an Iranian academic and conservative politician. Ghafourifard held government portfolios in the 1980s, before being appointed to the Physical Education Organization under president Akbar Hashemi Rafsanjani.

Ghafourifard was born on 5 August 1943. He represented Tehran, Rey, Shemiranat, and Eslamshahr twice in the Parliament of Iran, as well as serving a brief spell from Mashhad and Kalat electoral district.

Ghafourifard ran for Iranian presidential elections twice, and was defeated in both October 1981 and 2001 elections.

Ghafourifard died on 9 March 2023, at the age of 79.

References

1943 births
2023 deaths
Members of the 1st Islamic Consultative Assembly
Members of the 5th Islamic Consultative Assembly
Members of the 7th Islamic Consultative Assembly
Members of the 8th Islamic Consultative Assembly
Deputies of Tehran, Rey, Shemiranat and Eslamshahr
Deputies of Mashhad and Kalat
Coalition of Iran's Independent Volunteers politicians
Islamic Coalition Party politicians
Central Council of the Islamic Republican Party members
Islamic Society of Engineers politicians
Islamic Society of Athletes politicians
Voice of Nation politicians
University of Kansas alumni
Candidates in the 2001 Iranian presidential election
Heads of Physical Education Organization
Government ministers of Iran
Academic staff of Imam Khomeini International University
Academic staff of Amirkabir University of Technology
Iranian governors
Popular Front of Islamic Revolution Forces politicians
Secretaries-General of political parties in Iran